The 2023 NXT Stand & Deliver is the upcoming third annual Stand & Deliver professional wrestling livestreaming event produced by WWE. It will be held exclusively for wrestlers from the promotion's NXT brand division. The event will take place on Saturday, April 1, 2023, at the Crypto.com Arena in Los Angeles, California as part of WrestleMania Weekend, being held the same day as WrestleMania 39 Night 1 with a special start time of 1 p.m. Eastern Time (10 a.m. Pacific). This will also be the first Stand & Deliver to livestream on Binge in Australia.

Production

Background

Stand & Deliver is an annual event held during WrestleMania week by WWE for their developmental brand, NXT, since 2021. On November 3, 2022, WWE announced that the third Stand & Deliver would be held on Saturday, April 1, 2023, at the Crypto.com Arena in Los Angeles, California. It will take place during the day of WrestleMania 39 Night 1 with a special start time of 1 p.m. Eastern Time. The event will be livestreamed on Peacock in the United States and the WWE Network in most international markets. It will also be the first Stand & Deliver to livestream on Binge in Australia after the Australian version of the WWE Network merged under Foxtel's channel Binge in January.  Tickets went on sale on November 18.

Storylines

The card will include matches that result from scripted storylines, where wrestlers portray heroes, villains, or less distinguishable characters in scripted events that build tension and culminate in a wrestling match or series of matches. Results are predetermined by WWE's writers on the NXT brand, while storylines are produced on the weekly television program, NXT, and the supplementary online streaming show, Level Up.

In December 2021, Johnny Gargano allowed his NXT contract to expire so he could stay home and spend time with his family following the birth of his first son. After this, Gargano would be interrupted by Grayson Waller, who proclaimed he was the future of NXT, before violently attacking Gargano. In August 2022, Gargano would return to WWE, now working on the Raw brand. Following his NXT Championship loss, Waller would go on to sabotage NXT until he got what he wanted. Despite being suspended by General Manager Shawn Michaels, Michaels agreed to talk things over with Waller at Roadblock. During the 'Grayson Waller Effect' talk show, Waller challenged Michaels to a match at Stand & Deliver, but he declined, saying that as much as he wanted to, there's someone who wants to have a match with Waller even more. Then, Michaels introduced Waller's surprise opponent for the event, which turned out to be Gargano, returning to NXT for the first time in 15 months.

At Vengeance Day, after Bron Breakker retained the NXT Championship, he was confronted by Carmelo Hayes (accompanied by Trick Williams). Over the coming weeks, Hayes continued to set his sights on the NXT Championship and at Roadblock, the two agreed to a title match at Stand & Deliver.

On the March 14 episode of NXT, Alba Fyre and Isla Dawn won a triple threat tag team match to become the number one contenders for Fallon Henley and Kiana James' NXT Women's Tag Team Championship at Stand & Deliver.

At Roadblock, after Roxanne Perez retained her NXT Women's Championship, suddenly collapsed in the ring. Perez was then taken out of the arena in an ambulance, while nodding her head to say that she was okay. On the next week, WWE executive Shawn Michaels issued the statement via Twitter, that Perez was discharged from the hospital, however, after numerous tests, Perez's health was still in question. With that fact, Michaels announced a ladder match at Stand & Deliver to crown a new NXT Women's Champion. Qualifying matches started at the same episode, where Zoey Stark and Gigi Dolin qualified by defeated Sol Ruca and Kiana James, respectively.

On the March 14 episode of NXT, after Wes Lee issued an open challenge for his NXT North American Championship, a huge brawl was burst. NXT Anonymous video showed Shawn Michaels telling Lee that he would be defending his title in a fatal five-way match at Stand & Deliver and allowed Lee to select his four opponents.

Matches

References

External links
 

2023 WWE Network events
April 2023 events in the United States
WWE NXT
2023 in California
Events in Los Angeles
Professional wrestling in Los Angeles
Scheduled professional wrestling shows